41xx steel is a family of SAE steel grades, as specified by the Society of Automotive Engineers (SAE). Alloying elements include chromium and molybdenum, and as a result these materials are often informally referred to as chromoly steel (common variant stylings include chrome-moly, cro-moly, CrMo, CRMO, CR-MOLY, and similar).  They have an excellent strength to weight ratio and are considerably stronger and harder than standard 1020 steel, but are not easily welded, requiring thermal treatment both before and after welding to avoid cold cracking.

While these grades of steel do contain chromium, it is not in great enough quantities to provide the corrosion resistance found in stainless steel.

Examples of applications for 4130, 4140 and 4145 include structural tubing, bicycle frames, gas bottles for transportation of pressurized gases, firearm parts, clutch and flywheel components, and roll cages. 4150 stands out as being one of the steels accepted for use in M16 rifle and M4 carbine barrels by the United States military. These steels are also used in aircraft parts and therefore 41xx grade structural tubing is sometimes referred to as "aircraft tubing".

Properties

Other characteristics 
One of the characteristics of this class of steel is the ability to be case hardened by carburization of the surface.  The core of the material retains its bulk properties, while the outer surface is significantly hardened to reduce wear and tear.  This makes this grade of steel an excellent material for uses such as gears, piston pins, and crankshafts.

4140 Steel 
4140 Steel (Quenched and Tempered) Mechanical Properties

References 

Steels